The 1975 U.S. National Indoor Tennis Championships was a men's tennis tournament held at the Wicomico Youth and Civic Center in Salisbury, Maryland. The event was part of the 1975 USLTA-IPA Indoor Circuit. It was the fifth edition of the tournament and was held from February 10 through February 16, 1975, and played on indoor carpet courts. Second-seeded Jimmy Connors won the singles title and earned $9,000 first-prize money.

Finals

Singles
 Jimmy Connors defeated  Vitas Gerulaitis 5–7, 7–5, 6–1, 3–6, 6–0
 It was Connors' 3rd singles title of the year, and the 35th of his career.

Doubles
 Jimmy Connors /  Ilie Năstase defeated  Jan Kodeš /  Roger Taylor 7–6, 6–2

References

External links
 ITF tournament edition details

Tennis tournaments in the United States
Salisbury, Maryland
U.S. National Indoor Tennis Championships
U.S. National Indoor Tennis Championships
U.S. National Indoor Tennis Championships